Jamna Górna  ( Yamna Horishnia) was a village in the administrative district of Gmina Ustrzyki Dolne, within Bieszczady County, Subcarpathian Voivodeship, in south-eastern Poland.

Jamna Górna was founded on Walachian law at the beginning of the 16th century as a royal village and belonged to the Przemyśl starosty. At the turn of the 16th and 17th centuries, the village was separated from the Przemyśl starosty and leased.

In 1628, Adam Ostrowski was its user, then the owner of fishermen's goods Mikołaj Osoliński, after his death from 1663 his son Jerzy Osoliński. Adam Konarski, the castellan of Sandomierz, was the last tenant from whom in 1788 the Austrian government took over the village.

In 1812, the conqueror sold the village to the owner of the fishermen's estate to Paweł Tyszkowski and remained in the hands of Tyszkowscy Jamna Górna until 1939. Konstanty Tyszkowski was her last pre-war owner. In the nineteenth century, the village belonged to the Greek Catholic parish in Trinity, and there was a wooden church Orthodox church of St. Michael Archangel from 1843.

In 1946 and in 1947, in the region of Jamna Górna, there were two infantry clashes between the Polish Army and the Military Intelligence Agency with the UPA units. The population of the village was displaced in 1945 and 1947 and the buildings were demolished.

The church was demolished or burnt in 1956 and the village ceased to exist.

Main article: Orthodox church of St. Michael the Archangel in Jamna Gorna.

In the 1960s, a secret complex of the Center of the Council of Ministers' Holiday Center was erected in the village of Arłamów (591 m above sea level) [5]. Jamna Górna became part of the center, which also included villages: Arłamów, Borysławka, Grąziowa, Jamna Dolna, Krajna, Kwaszenina, Łomna and Trójca, in total about 23,000 ha. The center served as a hunting ground for the then party and government elite and their guests not only from "brotherly countries". A special Krajna airport was also built for them near Bircza, where the Arłamów landing ground has been operating since 2012 [4].

After the imposition of martial law, Lech Wałęsa, chairman of Solidarity, was interned in the Center between 11 May and 14 November 1982. In 1989, the government center was liquidated. The outposts at the entrance survived until mid-1991.

A separate article: The Arłamów state.

The former hotel complex in 1991 was taken over by the commune of Ustrzyki Dolne. Over the next few years, the commune authorities failed to find a reliable host. In 1996, the hotel, together with the outbuildings and the adjacent area, was sold to Fabryka Urządzeń Mechanicznych "KAMAX SA" from Kańczuga.

The facilities were renovated, the number of places and the standard of the center was increased, the ski lift was opened. In 2006, following the sale of Kamax, the center includes Antoni Kubicki, an engineer - inventor from Przeworsk. Establishes the company "Hotel Arłamów SA" and in 2010 begins the construction of a new hotel and the expansion and modernisation of the existing building complex.

The foundation stone for the construction was laid in October 2010 by Lech Wałęsa. The whole as the East European Sports and Congress Center was put into use at the beginning of 2014. The project received EU funding (mainly for ecological values). "Hotel Arłamów" is a 213-hectare hotel complex with extensive sports and recreational facilities (among others, a golf course, equestrian center, ski complex, multi-functional fields and a rope park) [4].

Notable people born in Jamna Górna include Stefania Kuts (née Budasz).

References

Villages in Bieszczady County